This is a list of articles about Norwegian actors ordered alphabetically by last name.



A, Å 

 Hauk Aabel
 Per Aabel
 Harald Aimarsen
 Zahid Ali
 Iselin Alme 
 Rønnaug Alten
 Leif Amble-Næss
 Bjarne Andersen
 Inger Marie Andersen
 Siw Anita Andersen
 Marit Andreassen
 Anna-Lisa
 Atle Antonsen
 Eilif Armand
 Frøydis Armand
 Gisken Armand
 Merete Armand
 Urda Arneberg
 Conrad Arnesen
 Haakon Arnold
 Janicke Askevold
 Per Fredrik Åsly
 Egil Åsman
 Per Asplin
 Trond Fausa Aurvåg

B 

 Bentein Baardson
 Anders Baasmo
 Øystein Bache
 Anna Bache-Wiig
 Turid Balke
 Elisabeth Bang
 Arne Bang-Hansen
 Kjetil Bang-Hansen
 Pål Bang-Hansen
 Petronella Barker
 Tula Belle
 Ingrid Bolsø Berdal
 Gustav Berg-Jæger
 Theodor Berge
 Eva Bergh
 Lene Elise Bergum
 Victor Bernau
 Finn Bernhoft
 Sofie Bernhoft
 Unni Bernhoft
 Andrea Berntzen
 Mari Bjørgan
 Roy Bjørnstad
 Magda Blanc
 Magne Bleness
 Øivind Blunck
 Alf Blütecher
 Bjarne Bø
 Alisha Boe
 Albert Vilhelm Bøgh
 Jens Bolling
 Maria Bonnevie
 Odd Borg
 Vanessa Borgli
 Geir Børresen
 Aagot Børseth
 Henrik Børseth
 Bente Børsum
 Harriet Bosse
 Berit Brænne
 Randi Brænne
 Trond Brænne
 Margit Brataas
 Kolbjørn Brenda
 Heidi Gjermundsen Broch
 Ida Elise Broch
 Nicolai Cleve Broch
 Per Bronken
 Louise Brun
 Jonas Brunvoll Jr.
 Trond Brænne
 Johannes Brun
 Tove Bryn
 Karl-Ludvig Bugge
 Marie Magdalene Bull
 Kolbjørn Buøen
 Sæbjørn Buttedahl
 Aase Bye
 Carsten Byhring

C 

 Joachim Calmeyer
 Sofie Cappelen
 Edith Carlmar
 Otto Carlmar
 Lalla Carlsen
 Bab Christensen
 Gyda Christensen
 Jørn Christensen
 Nils Reinhardt Christensen
 Per Christensen
 Rolf Christensen
 Ingeborg Cook
 Kåre Conradi

D 

 Ewa Da Cruz
 Sophus Dahl
 Juni Dahr
 Rolf Daleng
 Tone Danielsen
 Signe Danning
 Ingvild Deila
 Aagot Didriksen
 Ernst Diesen
 Kari Diesen
 Øystein Dolmen
 Liv Dommersnes
 Kjersti Døvigen
 Ulrikke Hansen Døvigen
 Edvard Drabløs
 Erling Drangsholt
 Anneli Drecker
 Svend von Düring
 Johanne Dybwad

E 

 Edel Eckblad
 Espen Eckbo
 Johannes Eckhoff
 Sigurd Eldegard
 Julie Ege
 Ingjerd Egeberg
 Aud Egede-Nissen
 Oscar Egede-Nissen
 Stig Egede-Nissen
 Hildegunn Eggen
 Harald Eia
 Egil Eide
 Jon Eikemo
 Maryon Eilertsen
 Per Christian Ellefsen
 Lena Kristin Ellingsen
 Kjersti Elvik
 Leif Enger
 Ole Enger
 Åsleik Engmark
 Berit Erbe
 Henning Eriksen
 Uta Erickson
 Beate Eriksen
 Jacob Margido Esp
 Unni Evjen

F 

 Einar Fagstad
 Alma Fahlstrøm
 Johan Fahlstrøm
 Vibeke Falk
 Magnus Falkberget
 Mona Fastvold
 Frithjof Fearnley
 Jack Fjeldstad
 Lise Fjeldstad
 Veronika Flåt
 Bjørn Floberg
 Lizzie Florelius
 Astrid Folstad
 Emilie da Fonseca
 Minken Fosheim
 Tore Foss
 Wenche Foss
 Hjalmar Fries
 Charlotte Frogner
 Kristin Frogner
 Kristine Froseth

G 

 Mikkel Gaup
 Nils Gaup
 Kat Gellin
 Claes Gill
 Martin Gisti
 Henry Gleditsch
 Jarl Goli
 Laila Goody
 Elisabeth Gording
 Elisabeth Granneman
 Bredo Greve
 Gerd Grieg
 Grace Grung
 Hilde Grythe
 Odd Grythe
 Anne Gullestad
 Jon Eivind Gullord
 Laura Gundersen
 Mia Gundersen
 Sigvard Gundersen
 Jens Gunderssen
 Aslag Guttormsgaard
 Greta Gynt

H 

 Brit Elisabeth Haagensli
 Agnete Haaland
 Ingjald Haaland
 Turid Haaland
 Pål Sverre Valheim Hagen
 Klaus Hagerup
 Nils Hald
 Ragnhild Hald
 Stein Grieg Halvorsen
 Marie Hamsun
 Henriette Hansen
 Sverre Hansen
 Knut Mørch Hansson
 Olaf Mørch Hansson
 Eili Harboe
 Morten Harket
 Thorbjørn Harr
 Jan Hårstad
 Terje Hartviksen
 Veslemøy Haslund
 Gunnar Haugan
 Solveig Haugan
 Kim Haugen
 Per Theodor Haugen
 Gøril Havrevold
 Olafr Havrevold
 Kristian Hefte
 Jon Heggedal
 Gustav Adolf Hegh
 Else Heiberg 
 Kirsten Heiberg
 Harald Heide-Steen jr.
 Kine Hellebust
 Liv Heløe
 Benjamin Helstad
 Sonja Henie
 Aksel Hennie
 Camilla Stroem Henriksen
 Stig Frode Henriksen
 Knut Hergel
 Ragnhild Hilt
 Erik Hivju
 Kristofer Hivju
 Bjarte Hjelmeland
 Egil Hjorth-Jenssen
 Willie Hoel
 Anette Hoff
 Stig Henrik Hoff
 Mona Hofland
 Espen Klouman Høiner
 Sverre Holm
 Kjersti Holmen
 Joachim Holst-Jensen
 Betzy Holter
 Karl Holter
 Didi Holtermann
 Sverre Horge
 Ellen Horn
 Andrea Bræin Hovig
 Benedicte Hundevadt
 Svein Sturla Hungnes
 Knut Husebø
 Sigrid Huun
 Ella Hval

I 

 Lillebil Ibsen
 Andreas Isachsen
 Janny Grip Isachsen
 Ellen Isefiær
 Ola Isene

J 

 Anne Marit Jacobsen
 Inger Jacobsen
 Knut Jacobsen
 Per Jansen
 Otto Jespersen
 Ola B. Johannessen
 Pål Johannessen
 Kristoffer Joner
 Helge Jordal
 Leif Juster
 Sissel Juul

K 

 Nils Jørgen Kaalstad
 Reidar Kaas
 Bente Kahan
 Grethe Kausland
 Adil Khan
 Negar Khan
 Marit Velle Kile
 Trond Kirkvaag
 Agnes Kittelsen
 Jorunn Kjellsby
 Johan Kjelsberg
 Frank Kjosås
 Thoralf Klouman
 Wenche Klouman
 David Knudsen
 Erike Kirstine Kolstad
 Henki Kolstad
 Lasse Kolstad
 Lisa Loven Kongsli
 Herborg Kråkevik
 Ada Kramm
 Anne Krigsvoll
 Marianne Krogness
 Sossen Krohg
 Georg Herman Krohn
 Frank Krog
 Kaare Kroppan
 Jannike Kruse
 Finn Kvalem
 Per Kvist

L 

 Finn Lange
 Mette Lange-Nielsen
 Jørgen Langhelle
 Britt Langlie
 Rolf Kristian Larsen
 Tryggve Larssen
 Lars Andreas Larssen
 Rolf Kristian Larsen
 Dore Lavik
 Britta Lech-Hanssen
 Tutte Lemkow
 Anders Danielsen Lie
 Arne Lie
 Per Lillo-Stenberg
 Liv Lindeland
 Lothar Lindtner
 Martin Linge
 Anneke von der Lippe
 Kalle Løchen
 Georg Løkkeberg
 Vibeke Løkkeberg
 Birger Løvaas
 Thorleif Lund
 Vilhelm Lund
 Hilde Lyrån
 Elsa Lystad
 Knut Lystad
 Synnøve Macody Lund
 Thorleif Lund
 Eva Lunde 
 Hilde Lyrån
 Elsa Lystad

M 

 Harald Mæle
 Abigael Heber Magnussøn
 Sigurd Magnussøn
 Alf Malland
 Natassia Malthe
 Øystein Martinsen
 Henriette Mathiesen
 Tom Mathisen
 Alfred Maurstad
 Mari Maurstad
 Toralv Maurstad
 Gørild Mauseth
 Katja Medbøe
 Wenche Medbøe 
 Mildred Mehle
 David Menkin
 Henrik Mestad
 Ragnhild Michelsen
 Daud Mirza
 Fridtjof Mjøen
 Sonja Mjøen
 Jon Lennart Mjøen
 Lars Mjøen
 Henny Moan
 Tarjei Sandvik Moe
 Grynet Molvig
 Cally Monrad
 Cecilie Mosli
 Tone Mostraum
 Agnes Mowinckel
 Lillian Müller
 Wenche Myhre
 Dagmar Myhrvold
 Trond Peter Stamsø Munch

N 

 Arne Lindtner Næss
 Petter Næss
 Randi Lindtner Næss
 Thea Sofie Loch Næss
 Thora Neels-Hansson
 Live Nelvik
 Fredrikke Nielsen
 Ellen Nikolaysen
 Hans Jacob Nilsen
 Ole-Jørgen Nilsen
 Rolf Just Nilsen
 Siri Nilsen
 Arvid Nilssen
 Aagot Nissen 
 Trond Nilssen
 Greta Nissen
 Sven Nordin
 Grete Nordrå
 Lars Nordrum
 Alf Nordvang
 Yngvar Numme
 Lisbeth Nyborg
 William Nyrén
 Lene Nystrøm

O, Ø  

 August Oddvar
 Nina Ellen Ødegård
 Jakob Oftebro
 Nils Ole Oftebro
 Jon Øigarden
 Ingrid Olava
 Gunnar Olram
 Arne Thomas Olsen
 Kari Onstad
 Lydia Opøien
 Arve Opsahl
 Jørn Ording
 Liv Bernhoft Osa
 Ola Otnes
 Anne Marie Ottersen
 Marian Saastad Ottesen
 Sigrun Otto
 Mads Ousdal
 Sverre Anker Ousdal
 Baard Owe
 Gard Øyen
 Lars Øyno

P 

 Sofie Parelius
 Josefine Frida Pettersen
 Mads Sjøgård Pettersen
 Lita Prahl

Q
 Pehr Qværnstrøm

R 

 Karen Randers-Pehrson
 Alf Ramsøy
 Bernhard Ramstad
 Rasmus Rasmussen
 Sophie Reimers
 Silje Reinåmo
 Helge Reiss
 Tom Remlov
 Iren Reppen
 Georg Richter
 Kristine Riis
 Knut Risan
 Frank Robert
 Margarete Robsahm
 Ingolf Rogde
 Jan Gunnar Røise
 Birgitte Cornelia Rojahn
 Tutta Rolf
 Katie Rolfsen
 Siri Rom
 Einar Rose
 Morten Rudå
 Amund Rydland
 Anne Ryg
 Inger Lise Rypdal

S 

 Andrine Sæther
 Egil Sætren
 Steinar Sagen
 Tore Sagen
 Fridtjov Såheim
 Bjørn Sand
 Rolf Sand
 Vidar Sandem
 Toralf Sandø
 Tobias Santelmann
 Julia Schacht
 Ingolf Schanche
 Guri Schanke
 Svein Scharffenberg
 Kristopher Schau
 Agnethe Schibsted-Hansson
 Erik A. Schjerven
 Aud Schønemann
 August Schønemann
 Erna Schøyen
 Hege Schøyen
 Ragnar Schreiner
 Augusta Schrumpf
 Astrid Schwab
 Tone Schwarzott
 Harald Schwenzen
 Tore Segelcke
 Trond Espen Seim
 Sissel Sellæg
 Ågot Gjems Selmer
 Jens Selmer
 Liv Uchermann Selmer 
 Ulf Selmer
 Ingebjørg Sem
 Mikkel Bratt Silset
 Ellen Sinding
 Karin Simonnæs
 Kari Simonsen
 Einar Sissener
 Stian Barsnes Simonsen
 Olga Sjøgren
 Linn Skåber
 Bjørn Skagestad
 Gunnar Skar
 Hugo Mikal Skår
 Jenny Skavlan
 Espen Skjønberg
 Eugen Skjønberg
 Henny Skjønberg
 Pål Skjønberg
 Christian Skolmen
 Jon Skolmen
 Nils Sletta
 Eva Sletto
 Augusta Smith
 Rolf Søder
 Alfred Solaas
 Astrid Sommer
 Botten Soot
 Reidar Sørensen
 Hans Ola Sørlie
 Kirsten Sørlie
 Kirsti Sparboe
 Lene Cecilia Sparrok
 Robert Sperati
 Thea Stabell
 Fredrik Steen
 Harald Steen
 Harald Heide Steen
 Liv Steen
 Trulte Heide Steen 
 Nanna Stenersen
 Linn Stokke
 Lisa Stokke
 Tor Stokke
 Robert Stoltenberg
 Dennis Storhøi
 Guri Stormoen
 Hans Stormoen
 Harald Stormoen
 Kjell Stormoen
 Gisle Straume
 Julian Strøm 
 Per Sunderland
 Gunnhild Sundli
 Bjørn Sundquist
 Ivar Svendsen
 Kari Svendsen
 Arne Svendsen
 Sigrun Svenningsen

T 

 Marie Takvam
 Kadir Talabani
 Lisa Teige
 Bjørnar Teigen
 Rut Tellefsen
 Tom Tellefsen
 Rune Temte
 Anita Thallaug
 Knut Thomassen
 Thomas Thomassen
 Børt-Erik Thoresen
 Liv Thorsen
 Axel Thue 
 Svein Tindberg
 Pia Tjelta
 Bjarte Tjøstheim
 Gunnar Tolnæs
 Herman Tømmeraas
 Asbjørn Toms
 Lisa Tønne
 Trond-Viggo Torgersen
 Unni Torkildsen
 Ane Dahl Torp
 Silje Torp
 Einar Tveito
 Lars Tvinde

U 

 Erik Ulfsby
 Liv Ullmann
 Nils Utsi

V 

 Einar Vaage 
 Dag Vågsås
 Ingerid Vardund
 Line Verndal
 Nils Vogt
 Jan Voigt
 Johanne Voss

W 

 Gudrun Waadeland
 Sølvi Wang
 Ulf Wengård
 Rolv Wesenlund
 Ragna Wettergreen
 Stub Wiberg
 Ottar Wicklund
 Claus Wiese
 Knut Wigert
 Sonja Wigert
 Ingrid Øvre Wiik
 Øystein Wiik
 Ryan Wiik
 Sverre Wilberg
 Odd-Magnus Williamson
 Liv Wilse 
 Stein Winge
 Viktoria Winge
 Carsten Winger
 Lucie Wolf
 Emmy Worm-Müller

Y 

 Bård Ylvisåker
 Vegard Ylvisåker

Z 

 Vera Zorina

References

Norwegian actors

Actors